The 1918 Curtiss Jenny Air Mail Stamps were a set of three Airmail postage stamps issued by the United States in 1918. The 24¢ variety was the first of the stamps to be issued, and was in fact, America's first Airmail stamp. (The world's first airmail stamp was issued by Italy in 1917). The 16¢ and 6¢ varieties were issued later in the year to reflect reductions in the postage rate.  It features the image of the Curtiss JN-4 airplane.

The order of the Scott Catalog numbers for these stamps (C1 through C3) is the inverse of the order of release dates for the stamps.

Individual stamp designs

Inverted Jenny error 

A single sheet of 100 of the two-color 24¢ was printed with the center design inverted, thus creating the Inverted Jenny.

References

External links 
 InvertedJenny.com
 1847 USA article
 Kenmore Stamp article

Postage stamps of the United States
Curtiss Jenny Airmail Stamps, 1918
Airmail stamps